Adamus is a surname. Notable people with this surname include:

Bartłomiej Adamus (born 2000), Polish weightlifter
Bernard Adamus (born 1977), Canadian singer-songwriter 
Dariusz Adamus (born 1957), Polish javelin thrower
Jan Tomasz Adamus (born 1968), Polish conductor, organist, chamber musician, recording artist and music administrator

See also